TrueReal is an American digital multicast television network owned by the Katz Broadcasting subsidiary of the E. W. Scripps Company. TrueReal is targeted at women aged 25–54.

TrueReal and Defy TV, a complementary network targeted at men aged 25–54, launched together on July 1, 2021, with broadcast coverage of 92% of the United States.

History
On March 2, 2021, Scripps announced that it would launch two new multicast networks—Defy and TrueReal—in the wake of its acquisition of Ion Media and television transmitters across the United States. The channels are part of Scripps's strategy to increase penetration among cord cutters that do not have traditional pay-TV packages.

The services launched on July 1 with 92% national coverage, mostly on Ion transmitters but also on subchannels of some Scripps local TV stations and by agreement with other station groups.

On March 10, 2023, Scripps announced that TrueReal would shut down on March 27 of that month, merging its programming with that of Defy TV. After its closure, Scripps will lease the open spectrum on its owned and operated stations to Jewelry Television.

Programming
Launch programs for TrueReal are reality programs from the library of A&E Networks, including Storage Wars, Little Women: LA, Intervention, Hoarders, My Crazy Ex and Wahlburgers.

References

External links

Television networks in the United States
Defunct television networks in the United States
Women's interest channels
Television channels and stations established in 2021
E. W. Scripps Company

Television channels and stations disestablished in 2023